Tjark de Vries (born 17 July 1965) is a Dutch rower. He competed in the men's coxless four event at the 1988 Summer Olympics.

References

External links
 

1965 births
Living people
Dutch male rowers
Olympic rowers of the Netherlands
Rowers at the 1988 Summer Olympics
People from Waddinxveen
Sportspeople from South Holland